"Misi Kardia", a Rock ballad, is a Greek song by Helena Paparizou. It was exclusively impacted on Dromos Fm 89,8 fm for Athens ando n Cosmoradio 95,1 fm for Thessaloniki on February 8  and later official released on February 15 as a digital single along the music video on Vevo. The song was written by Chris Mazz, Andy Nicolas & Giannis Doxas. It is the second official single from her sixth Greek studio album Ouranio Toxo which was released on December 15, 2017

Music video
The music video premiered on VEVO on February 15. The video was directed by Sherif Francis.

Charts

Release history

References 

2015 singles
Helena Paparizou songs
Pop ballads
English-language Greek songs
2015 songs
EMI Records singles
Songs written by Giannis Doxas
Songs written by Andy Nicolas
Greek-language songs